Chinese Doctors is a 2021 Chinese disaster film co-produced, co-cinematographed and directed by Andrew Lau and starring Zhang Hanyu, Yuan Quan, Zhu Yawen, Li Chen, with Jackson Yee and Oho Ou. The film follows the story of frontline medical workers fought against the COVID-19 pandemic in Wuhan Jinyintan Hospital, Hubei, China. The film premiered in China on 9 July 2021, to commemorate the 100th anniversary of the Chinese Communist Party. The film received mixed to positive reviews and won Best Music at the 34th Golden Rooster Awards.

Plot 
Chinese Doctors tells the story of Wuhan doctors and nurses with Wuhan Jinyintan Hospital as the core and medical staff from all over the country assisting Wuhan City, Hubei Province to fight the COVID-19 Outbreak.

On the eve of the Spring Festival in 2020, people all over the country are immersed in the joy of the New Year, and the people of Wuhan are no exception, but the inexplicable pneumonia began to spread. There were only a few cases at the beginning, and then more and more patients were sent to Jinyintan Hospital, and more and more patients came to the hospital to see a doctor. Realized that this was a serious infectious disease. Then there is helplessness. This helplessness is not only the feeling of the patient, but also the feeling of the doctor. The new coronavirus is cunning and sinister. Doctors knew too little about it at first, and the means to fight it were limited. One patient after another died in front of the doctor, leaving the doctor helpless. Doctors are also ordinary people. They will have verbal conflicts because of differences in treatment methods, and will doubt the meaning of their profession at a certain moment because they have not saved patients.

Then, the speed of China displayed by Mount Vulcan and Leishenshan, and the feeling of home and country of "giving up a small family and caring for everyone" embodied by the retrogrades who rushed to help Wuhan in all directions, the whole society thinks and strives to build the Great Wall of Steel together. : Let the audience's emotions slowly turn from tension and helplessness, and a powerful force grows from the heart. Heroic cities, heroic doctors, heroic people, patriotism, collectivism, altruism, and the superiority of party leadership and the socialist system are the reasons why we must and must win.

Doctor Yang Xiaoyang also has a distinct growth line. He is a fledgling resident physician. When he first appeared on the field, he would imitate President Zhang's walking posture, which was a little naughty. After the outbreak, he was afraid, but he also stood his ground. Because of his lack of practical experience, he hesitated for a while to intubate patients. , was directly despised by Tao Jun, Tao Jun even asked him to stop appearing in the intensive care unit; Xiaoyang trained over and over in private, and finally completed his transformation... The growth of Xiaoyang in the ordeal is also what many young people have experienced in this epidemic.

The delivery man Jin Zai and his wife Xiaowen represent the perspectives of patients and society, and are also a group of characters that are more inked in the film. This young couple misunderstood the doctor and accepted the process of gratitude, which may also be the mental journey of many patients in the early stage of the epidemic; the doctor tried his best to save the young couple, especially taking great risks for Xiaowen. The cesarean section is the epitome of the doctor's efforts to rescue the patient during the epidemic; Jin Zai took the risk to deliver food to help those in need, which reflects the mutual help of ordinary people during the epidemic; and after the epidemic, the happy family of three met Wen Ting by chance. , also means that the epidemic will always pass, and life will continue...

At the end of the film, Jin Zai and Xiao Wen bring their children to meet Wen Ting again. The meaning of this scene is obvious - after the brave and magnificent story has passed, what is left behind is infinite hope. How will these two lovely young men tell their children about these years in the future? I believe that this experience will be the most valuable asset in their lives.

Cast

Movie song

Movie box office

Production 
After the shooting of The Captain (2019 film), Andrew Lau accepted the task of shooting Chinese Doctors. Most cast members of The Captain joined the cast. Experts from the Propaganda Department of the Chinese Communist Party, National Health Commission, Chinese Center for Disease Control and Prevention, Hubei Provincial Health Commission, and Hubei Provincial Center for Disease Control and Prevention participated in script revision. The film began production in April 2020 and finished filming in Guangzhou on 23 December of that same year. Filming also took place in Wuxi, Wuhan, and Shanghai.

Behind the scenes 
At the beginning of April 2020, the first time Wuhan "unblocked", the creative team of Bona Films conducted an interview with the Guangdong medical team in Hubei, and together with Academician Zhong Nanshan himself, the first person from Guangzhou to assist Wuhan, and the Guangdong aid The Hubei medical team, as well as hundreds of medical workers at the forefront of the anti-epidemic front, such as Wuhan Jinyintan Hospital, Tongji Medical College Affiliated to Huazhong University of Science and Technology, Zhongnan Hospital of Wuhan University, Wuhan Central Hospital, etc. first-hand information.  The actors also went to the hospital to experience and learn to accompany them.

Shooting scene: "Chinese Doctor" builds a "medical-grade studio" in a 1:1 ratio. The filming uses hospital equipment in strict accordance with the construction standards of real hospitals, and is even renovated by a professional hospital. The staff will not start shooting until they pass the inspection. Actors have undergone medical training before filming, learning how to wear protective clothing and isolation gowns, as well as rescue techniques such as cardiac resuscitation, vascular puncture, tracheal intubation, and even extracorporeal membrane lung ECMO (commonly known as "artificial lung"). Many people in the show are also real medical workers. All medical equipment can be used in real life, and oxygen, water, and electricity are all connected.

 During the filming of the film in Wuxi Movie Metropolis, 7 studios were used to set up the scene. Except for the studio used for the recording of "China New Rap", the rest were rented for the film.

 The filming scene of the film in Wuhan temporarily caused misunderstanding among netizens, for which the crew issued a statement to refute the rumor.
 Zhang Hanyu took the initiative to go to Jinyintan Hospital to live with President Zhang Dingyu for three days before starting the machine. He followed President Zhang to meetings and ward rounds. He not only saw the working status of President Zhang, but also observed many important details that helped shape his role. Ready to shoot。In addition to learning to speak Hubei dialect, Zhang Hanyu also carefully grasps Zhang Dingyu's walking posture and presents it in a controlled manner.
 In order to play the role of the director of the critical care medicine department, Yuan Quan has bruises all over her face and white hands every day. In one scene, she wore protective clothing for 8 hours in a row.  Not only did she continue to practice wearing protective clothing and learn medical knowledge, she also asked medical workers who had experienced the frontline of the epidemic for personal experience.  
 During the filming of "Chinese Doctor", the film crew and screenwriter interviewed the team. On the evening of April 7, 2020, the machine was set up at the entrance and exit of the expressway, waiting to shoot the moment when the Lihan Passage was "unblocked". In the early morning of April 8, the scene of people eating hot and dry noodles in the streets and alleys of Wuhan was shot again. This is our filmmakers, a tribute to this city.

Release 
Chinese Doctors was slated for release on 9 July 2021 in China.

Box office 
The film earned a total of 421 million yuan ($65.13 million) in its first four days of release.

Awards and nominations

Film review 
The winner of the "Medal of the Republic", Zhong Nanshan, an academician of the Chinese Academy of Engineering and a famous expert in pulmonology, wept many times during the viewing. He said: "The strongest feeling is that the film "Chinese Doctor" does not have any cover up, it really restores the situation in Wuhan in the early days, the difficulties we encountered, the tension of the beds and the emotions of the patients, I feel very real "

"Chinese Doctor" uses small emotions to set off big feelings. The movie focuses on showing the great love of medical staff who risk their lives to save lives and heal the wounded in the face of the epidemic, and does not shy away from their various emotions as ordinary people, even negative emotions: full of hope but finally disappointed, and their powerlessness to save their lives despite their best efforts Feelings, anxiety caused by the uncertainty of the treatment effect, grievances and guilt for not being able to take up family responsibilities, etc. In the extreme physical exhaustion and the great mental pressure, their perseverance and hard work mixed with pain are more real and valuable, and they have more touching power. (Review of Guangming Daily) 

The group portraits of medical staff represented by Zhang Jingyu, Wen Ting and Tao Jun in the film highlight the collectivism and dedication in the mainstream Chinese values. The ethos is also well expressed in the film. "Chinese Doctor" depicts a group of characters with distinct personalities. Among them, the prototype of Zhang Jingyu played by Zhang Hanyu is Zhang Dingyu, president of Jinyintan Hospital, and other doctors including Wen Ting and Tao Jun, although there is no clear character prototype, but their deeds are all familiar. In contrast, Yang Xiaoyang, a young doctor played by Yi Yangqianxi, is a fictional character. From him, the audience can see the image of a young man who is studious, optimistic and helpful. (Review of "Beijing Daily")

References

External links 
 
 

2021 films
2020s Mandarin-language films
Chinese disaster films
Films shot in Hubei
Films shot in Guangdong
Films shot in Jiangsu
Films shot in Shanghai
Films set in Wuhan
Films about the COVID-19 pandemic
2020s disaster films